Marko Čubrilo (born 3 May 1998) is a Bosnian-Herzegovinian football defender who plays for Serbian club Mladost Novi Sad.

Club career
Born in Novi Sad, Čubrilo came through FK Partizan academy where he played in the youth team and then in Partizan´s satellite team FK Teleoptik. With Teleoptik he played in the 2016–17 Serbian League Belgrade and next in the first half of the 2017–18 Serbian First League. During winter-break of the 2017–18 season he signed with FK Radnik Surdulica.

International career
Despite having been born in Novi Sad, Serbia, he decided to represent Bosnia and Herzegovina internationally having debuted for their under 19 team in 2016.

References

1998 births
Living people
Footballers from Novi Sad
Association football fullbacks
Bosnia and Herzegovina footballers
FK Partizan players
FK Teleoptik players
FK Radnik Surdulica players
NK Domžale players
OFK Žarkovo players
FK Budućnost Dobanovci players
FK Dinamo Vranje players
Serbian SuperLiga players
Serbian First League players
Bosnia and Herzegovina expatriate footballers
Expatriate footballers in Slovenia
Bosnia and Herzegovina expatriate sportspeople in Slovenia